Edgar Norman Crowe OBE (known as Norman) (1905 – 1992) was Chairman of the Executive Council from 1967 until 1971. He was also previously Chairman of the Finance Board.

References
The Isle of Man at rulers.org

1905 births
1992 deaths
Chairmen of the Executive Council of the Isle of Man
Manx politicians
Officers of the Order of the British Empire